Nathaniel Paul Kwame (born 15 October 1997) is a Ghanaian professional footballer who plays as defender for Liberty Professionals.

Career 
Kwame started his career with Liberty Professionals. In May 2018, he was promoted from the youth team to the senior team during the 2018 Ghana Premier League (GPL) season. Despite that did not make any appearance due to the league being cancelled as a result of the Anas Number 12 Expose. He made his senior debut during a 2019 GFA Normalization Committee Special Competition match against Dreams on 5 May 2019. He came on in the 80th minute to replace Benjamin Eshun as the match ended in a goalless draw. At the end of the competition he made 4 appearances.

On 10 April 2021, Kwame scored his debut GPL goal by scoring the first goal of a 4–0 victory against Elmina Sharks. On 11 July 2021, he scored an 80th-minute equalizer to help Liberty Professionals earn a 1–1 draw against champions Accra Hearts of Oak. He ended the 2020–21 season with 21 appearances and 2 goals.

References

External links 
 

Living people
1997 births
Association football defenders
Ghanaian footballers
Liberty Professionals F.C. players
Ghana Premier League players